Malden is a city in the northeast corner of Dunklin County, Missouri, United States, located near the intersection of Missouri Route 25 and U.S. Route 62. The population was 4,277 at the 2010 census. Malden is within Missouri's 8th congressional district.

History
Malden was platted in 1877 by a railroad official. Some say the community has the name of Colonel T. H. Mauldin, a county judge, while others believe the name is a transfer from Malden, Massachusetts.  A post office called Malden has been in operation since 1877.

Geography

Malden is located along the Crowley's Ridge Parkway.

Demographics

As of 2000 the median income for a household in the city was $22,910, and the median income for a family was $27,819. Males had a median income of $30,671 versus $16,920 for females. The per capita income for the city was $12,475. About 22.9% of families and 27.8% of the population were below the poverty line, including 37.4% of those under age 18 and 25.7% of those age 65 or over.

2010 census
As of the census of 2010, there were 4,275 people, 1,780 households, and 1,109 families residing in the city. The racial makeup of the city was 71.35% White, 25.12% Black or African American, 0.28% Native American, 0.35% Asian, 0.94% from other races, and 1.96% from two or more races. Hispanic or Latino of any race were 1.92% of the population.

There were 1,780 households, of which 31.6% had children under the age of 18 living with them, 37.0% were married couples living together, 20.5% had a female householder with no husband present, 4.8% had a male householder with no wife present, and 37.7% were non-families. 32.6% of all households were made up of individuals, and 14% had someone living alone who was 65 years of age or older. The average household size was 2.34 and the average family size was 2.94.

The median age in the city was 39.4 years. 25.1% of residents were under the age of 18; 9.3% were between the ages of 18 and 24; 22.7% were from 25 to 44; 25.6% were from 45 to 64; and 17.2% were 65 years of age or older. The gender makeup of the city was 46.5% male and 53.5% female.

Government

Transportation
Malden has one of the largest general aviation airports in the State of Missouri.  Malden is listed in the National Plan of Integrated Airport Systems, which identifies airports that are significant to national transportation. Malden's three  runways can handle most corporate aircraft. The city also has the Dunklin County Transit Bus System which travels throughout the city and the surrounding area.

The Malden Municipal Airport was an Army airfield and then an Air Force base from 1942 to 1960, as operated by the military and then under civilian contracts.  The airfield was used to train pilots to fight in World War II and the Korean War. The Malden Army Airfield Preservation Society (MAAPS) is an organization that works to preserve the past of the Malden Army Airfield. The MAAPS Military Museum is located in the airport's terminal building and MAAPS also maintains a Veterans Wall of Honor.

Education
The public school system of the Malden R-1 School District is a 3A designated school for athletics (2A for football).  The mascot is the Green Wave, and its last state championship was 2007, when the school won its second consecutive Boys Track championship. The Malden Green Wave Football program competed in the state playoffs in 2010 and the boys baseball team were conference regular season champions and won a district title for the first time in 31 years in 2011. The Malden school system has been named one of the top 10% of American High Schools for 3 years running and ranked as the best school in southeast Missouri based on 2009-2010 Missouri Assessment Program test scores. The Malden School Board was recognized by the Missouri School Board's Association as its Outstanding Board of the Year in 2011. Malden has two satellite college campuses, one from Three Rivers Community College and another from Southeast Missouri State University.

Malden has a public library, a branch of the Dunklin County Library.

Arts and culture
Malden is the home of the Bootheel Youth Museum. This is a hands-on activity-based museum for children. It has grown over the past few years and has had over 140,000 visitors.  It is a resource for Malden school district as well as surround districts. The most recent addition is the Lewis and Clark site. The Museum was a National Award winner in 2012 and was named a top youth attraction in America.

Other attractions include:
The Malden Historical Museum, which displays the history of Malden. 
Malden Community Center
Malden Veterans Wall of Honor

Climate
Climate is characterized by relatively high temperatures and evenly distributed precipitation throughout the year.  The Köppen Climate Classification subtype for this climate is "Cfa" (Humid Subtropical Climate).

Notable people
 Narvel Felts — Country music star
 Derland Moore — NFL lineman, 1973-1986
 Hub Pruett — Major League pitcher from 1922-1932
 George Richey - Country music songwriter and producer, and fifth husband and manager of Tammy Wynette

References

External links

 
 
 
 
 
 Historic maps of Malden in the Sanborn Maps of Missouri Collection at the University of Missouri

Cities in Dunklin County, Missouri
Cities in Missouri